The Cork Under-21 Football Championship is a Gaelic football competition in County Cork, Ireland for players under the age of 21. Clubs affiliated to Cork board compete to win this championship. All eight of the divisions in Cork organize their own championship. The divisional winners compete against each other to decide the county title.

Trophy
The winning team is presented with the Pádraig A. Ó Murchú Cup. This cup commemorates Patrick Aloyius "Weeshie" Murphy of Bere Island, who served the GAA for many years, both as a player and an administrator. He played at full back for Cork on the 1945 All-Ireland Senior Football Championship winning team, and also played club football for Beara and Lees.

Roll of honour

 The following finals were drawn: 1994, 1996, 2003, 2011

Under-21 B Football Championship
This competition is confined to clubs who compete at the B level in each of the regional divisions in County Cork. The winning team is presented with the Seán Ó Crualaoí Cup. Presented in 2010 by the Crowley family in memory of the late Seán Crowley of Bandon, who was a Vice-President of the County Board up until his death in 2009. Bandon was the sporting love of his life, followed by love for his division Carbery, Cork and Munster in that order.
He was Bandon's representative on the Carbery Board and also spent many years as Bandon's and Carbery's representative on the Cork County Board. He served as Chairman of the Carbery Board for a number of years and was also a selector for many years on Carbery Hurling and Football teams. He also acted as selector on the Cork Football All Ireland winning team of 1973 and on the successful Munster Railway Cup team of 1972, both successes which came after many years in the doldrums for both teams.

Under-21 C Football Championship

References

2011 Drawn Final report
2011 Final replay report

Sources
Cork GAA – A History 1886–1986  Jim Cronin
 Cork Under-21 Football Final Results

 5